This is a list of video game franchises by Square Enix, a Japanese video game development and publishing company formed from the merger of Enix and Square on April 1, 2003. Square Enix acquired Taito in September 2005, which continues to publish its own video games, and acquired game publisher Eidos Interactive in April 2009, which was merged with Square Enix's European publishing wing and renamed as Square Enix Europe.

Since its inception, the company has developed or published hundreds of titles in various video game franchises on numerous gaming systems. The company is best known for its role-playing video game franchises, which include the Final Fantasy, Dragon Quest, and Kingdom Hearts series. Of its properties, the Final Fantasy franchise is the best-selling, with a total worldwide sales of over 173 million units. The Dragon Quest series has sold over 85 million units worldwide and is one of the most popular video game series in Japan, while the Kingdom Hearts series has shipped over 36 million copies worldwide.

This list includes franchises in which Square Enix, or its original components Enix and Square, or its subsidiaries, were the primary developer or publisher, even if the series was begun prior to the subsidiary's acquisition. Franchises are defined as any set of interconnected media consisting of more than one release, and video game franchises are defined as franchises which were initially created as a video game or series of video games.

Video game franchises

 Key

Former franchises

Notes

See also
 List of best-selling Japanese role-playing game franchises
 List of Gangan Comics manga franchises
 List of Square Enix video games
 List of Square Enix mobile games
 List of Taito games

References

Square Enix
Square Enix